The 7th Aintree 200 was a Formula One motor race held on 28 April 1962 at Aintree Circuit, Merseyside. The race was run over 50 laps of the circuit, and was won by British driver Jim Clark in a Lotus 24-Climax. Clark also set pole position and fastest lap. Bruce McLaren in a Cooper-Climax was second and Ferrari driver Phil Hill was third.

Results

References
 "The Grand Prix Who's Who", Steve Small, 1995.
 "The Formula One Record Book", John Thompson, 1974.

Aintree 200
Aintree 200
Aintree 200